The following article presents a summary of the 2014–15 football season in Croatia, which is the 24th season of competitive football in the country.

National teams

Croatia

Croatia U21

Croatia U19

Croatia U17

League tables

Prva HNL

Druga HNL

Croatian clubs in Europe

Summary

Dinamo Zagreb

Rijeka

Hajduk Split

RNK Split

See also
 List of Croatian football transfers summer 2014

References